The  California Legislative Black Caucus, also known as the CLBC, is a California political organization composed of African Americans elected to the California State Legislature.

Priorities
The California Legislative Black Caucus represents and advocates for the interests of Black people throughout California. It seeks to increase African American participation and representation in all levels of government. Since the formation of the California Legislative Black Caucus (LBC), the core mission of the LBC has been to close (and, ultimately, to eliminate) disparities that exist between African-Americans and white Americans in every aspect of life.
Specific priorities of the LBC include:
  Increase Black representation in all levels of government, including statewide appointments and statewide elected offices.
 Creating employment opportunities and economic security for African Americans.
 Ensure the African American community has equal access to education, social services, health, mental health, and other government programs and services.
 Preserve safety net health, mental health, and social service programs that serve the African American community.
 Strengthen protections against hate crimes and defend the civil rights and liberties of Blacks.
 Fight racial stereotypes and negative portrayals of Blacks in the media.
 Promote greater civic participation and knowledge about major policy issues among the African American communities.
 Closing the achievement and opportunity gaps in education.
 Assuring quality health care for every Californian.
 Building wealth and business development for all Californians.
 Ensuring justice for all.
 Retirement security for all Californians.

History
The California Legislative Black Caucus was formed in 1967 when black members of the California Legislature joined together to strengthen their efforts to address the legislative concerns of black and minority citizens. The members believed that a black caucus in the California Legislature, speaking with a single voice, would provide political influence and visibility far beyond their numbers.

Current membership
Officers are elected from within the LBC with equal representation from both the Assembly and Senate members.
In 2007, more than a year before the general election, all but one of the members of the LBC endorsed Barack Obama for president.

Officers

Members

Notes

California State Legislature
State Legislative Black Caucuses
1967 establishments in California